Walteria is a region of the city of Torrance in southern California.  It is south of the Pacific Coast Highway. The local zip code is 90505.  Walteria is named after Captain A. Richard Walters of Atkinson, Illinois. Captain Walters moved to the California farming area in the 1880s and built a stagecoach stop, the Walters Hotel, on a main road connecting the salt works in Redondo Beach with the harbor in San Pedro. Residents are zoned to Walteria Elementary School, Richardson Middle School, and South High School.

The internationally famous La Primera pre-school in Walteria was founded by psychologist and author Fitzhugh Dodson in 1963.

References

Neighborhoods in Los Angeles County, California
Geography of Torrance, California